Patricia T. O'Conner (born Feb. 19, 1949) is the author of five books about the English language. A former staff editor at The New York Times Book Review, she has appeared regularly as a language commentator for WNYC and Iowa Public Radio. She has written extensively for The New York Times, including book reviews, On Language columns, and articles for the op-ed page and the Week in Review section. Her work has also appeared in Smithsonian, The Paris Review, the Literary Review (London), and other publications.

A native of Des Moines, Iowa, she graduated from Grinnell College in 1971 with a BA in philosophy and received an honorary degree from Grinnell in 2006. She did graduate work in urban journalism at the University of Minnesota, Minneapolis, before beginning her career as a reporter and editor in 1973. After several years at The Des Moines Register and  The Wall Street Journal, she joined the New York Times in 1982.

She and Stewart Kellerman, her husband and co-author of several books and articles, answer questions about the English language on The Grammarphobia Blog.

Publications
Woe Is I: The Grammarphobe's Guide to Better English in Plain English (Riverhead, 4th ed., 2019)
Origins of the Specious: Myths and Misconceptions of the English Language, co-authored by Kellerman (Random House, 2009)
Woe Is I Jr.: The Younger Grammarphobe's Guide to Better English in Plain English (Putnam, 2007)
You Send Me: Getting It Right When You Write Online, co-authored by Kellerman (Harcourt, 2002)
Words Fail Me: What Everyone Who Writes Should Know About Writing (Harcourt, 1999)
The Reader Over Your Shoulder, by Robert Graves with Alan Hodge; new introduction by Patricia T. O’Conner (Seven Stories Press, 2018)

References 

Year of birth missing (living people)
Living people
American women writers
Grinnell College alumni
Writers from Des Moines, Iowa
Etymologists
American women journalists
The New York Times editors
American copy editors
Writers of style guides
American broadcasters
American bloggers
21st-century American non-fiction writers
American women bloggers
21st-century American women writers